Stefano De Luigi (born 1964) is a German-born Italian photographer. De Luigi has been a member of VII Photo Agency since 2008 and lives in Paris.

Life and work
De Luigi was born in Cologne. He has been a professional photographer since 1988. He lived in Paris from 1989 to 1996, working for the Louvre Museum.

In 1998 he completed the project Celebrities, about the fashion world. In 2000 he started the project Pornoland, a photographic journey on pornographic film sets, published as a book in 2004. From 2003 to 2006, he worked on his series Blindness - a photographic project on the blindness condition in the world, published as Blanco (2010). Blindness won the W. Eugene Smith Memorial Fund grant in 2007 and Blanco the Pictures of the Year International Best Photography Book Award. In 2006 Luigi embarked on the project Cinema Mundi, a World Cinema exploration on the alternative cinematographic scene external to the Hollywood dream factory including China, Russia, Iran, Argentina, Nigeria, South Korea and India.

His photographs have been published in Stern, Paris Match, Le Monde 2, Time, The New Yorker, Internazionale, L'Espresso, Geo, Vanity Fair, El Pais and Sunday Times Magazine.

Publications
Pornoland.  2004. With a text by Martin Amis.
London: Thames & Hudson. .
Germany: Knessebeck.
France: La Martiniere.
Italy: Contrasto.
Blanco. London: Trolley, 2010. .
iDyssey. Paris: Bessard, 2017. .
Babel. With Michela Battaglia. Rome: Postcart, 2018. .
 "Pornoland Redux" Selfpublished 2021

Awards
1998: World Press Photo arts and entertainments (3rd stories)
2005: Marco Bastianelli Prize, for Pornoland
2007: W. Eugene Smith Memorial Fund Grant
2007: World Press Photo, arts and entertainment (2nd single)
2009: Moving Walls. Liberia child soldiers.
2010: Getty Grant for Editorial Photography
2010: World Press Photo, Contemporary Issue (2nd Single)
2010: Days Japan International Photojournalism Awards (1st Prize)
2011: World Press Photo (2nd Multimedia)
2011: Pictures of the Year International Best Photography Book Award, for Blanco 
2013: Special Jury Prize, Days Japan International Photojournalism Awards
2013: Prix du Festival de St-Brieuc, Saint Brieuc Photographie du Reportage
2015: Sygenta Prize.(3rd single)

References

France Culture
PhotoDoc

General references
MEP
Vice
Open society foundations

External links

Living people
1964 births
Italian photographers
Date of birth missing (living people)
VII Photo Agency photographers